Benslimane in a province of Morocco in the Casablanca-Settat Region. The province had a population of around 199,612 people in 2004 and covers an area of around 2,760 km².

Subdivisions
The province is divided administratively into the following:

References

 
Benslimane